Çorum Futbol Kulübü Anonim Şirketi is a Turkish football club located in Çorum, Turkey.

History 
The club was founded under the name Çorum Belediyespor in 1997. An amateur for most of its existence, it won the Turkish Regional Amateur League in the 2011–12 season and was promoted into the TFF Third League. On 20 December 2018, the club changed its name to Yeni Çorumspor. In November 2019, the club started a 3-year takeover process of the club Çorumspor. On 24 December 2019, the club again changed its name to Çorum FK, while it finalized a merger and acquisition of Çorumspor.

Colours and badge 
Originally playing under blue and white, the club's colours are red and black as of 2014.

Current squad

Other players under contract

Out on loan

Honours
Turkish Regional Amateur League: 2011–12

References

External links 
 Çorum FK Official website
 TFF Profile

Football clubs in Turkey
Association football clubs established in 2018